Costas Constantinou  served as the Chief Commissioner of the Cyprus Scouts Association.

In 1994, Constantinou was awarded the 233rd Bronze Wolf, the only distinction of the World Organization of the Scout Movement, awarded by the World Scout Committee for exceptional services to world Scouting.

References

External links

https://www.scout.org/BronzeWolfAward/list 

Recipients of the Bronze Wolf Award
Year of birth missing
Scouting and Guiding in Cyprus